Anders Hansen (born 1970) is a Danish golfer.

Anders Hansen may also refer to:
Anders C. Hansen, Norwegian mathematician
Anders Schmidt Hansen (born 1978), Danish golfer